served as the International Commissioner and advisor of the Scout Association of Japan, as well as Chairman of the Asia-Pacific Public Relations Subcommittee and Regional Task Force in 2007.

Kuno was a Varsity Scout, a Keio University graduate, and a member of Keio Scout Mita-kai alumni association.

In 2010, Kuno was awarded the 324th Bronze Wolf, the only distinction of the World Organization of the Scout Movement, awarded by the World Scout Committee for exceptional services to world Scouting.

References

External links

 
 
 

Recipients of the Bronze Wolf Award
Year of birth missing
Scouting in Japan
People from Tokyo